Mickey the Monkey was a comic strip which featured the eponymous fictional monkey, Mickey.  The character was the cover star of British comic The Topper from its launch in 1953 until the 1970s.  The strip appeared throughout the comic's run, until its merger with The Beezer. The final story was in The Beezer Annual 2003. It was originally drawn by Dudley D. Watkins, but after his death in 1969 Vic Neill took over as artist.

Appearances in popular culture
The Clash drummer Topper Headon, real name Nicholas Bowen Headon, earned his nickname from the band's guitarist Mick Jones due to his resemblance to Mickey the Monkey.

References 

British comic strips
Fictional monkeys
1953 comics debuts
British comics characters
Comics characters introduced in 1953
DC Thomson Comics strips
Comics about monkeys
Comics about animals
Gag-a-day comics
Male characters in comics